Jaime Mosen Ponz (1671 – 30 March 1730) was a Spanish painter.

Ponz was born and died at Valls near Tarragona. He trained in the school of the Junosas at Barcelona. In 1722 he painted a number of pictures for the Carthusians of Scala Dei. In 1723 he painted some frescoes on the dome of the 
Hermitage of Nuestra Señora de Misericordia. The parish church of Vails and Altafella also had some frescoes by Ponz.

References

People from Tarragona
Spanish Baroque painters
18th-century Spanish painters
18th-century Spanish male artists
17th-century Spanish painters
Spanish male painters
1671 births
1730 deaths
Date of birth unknown